Gustav Fröhlich (21 March 1902 – 22 December 1987) was a German actor and film director. He landed secondary roles in a number of films and plays before landing his breakthrough role of Freder Fredersen in Fritz Lang's 1927 film Metropolis. He remained a popular film star in Germany until the 1950s.

Biography

Early life and Weimar Republic 
Gustav Fröhlich was born  an illegitimate child in Hanover and was raised by foster parents. Before becoming an actor, he worked for a short time as an editor of a provincial newspaper and as the author of popular  novels. During World War I, he also volunteered for duty in occupied Brussels as a press supervisor.

Gustav Fröhlich began his stage career in the early 1920s at minor theatres in Germany. He quickly achieved more important roles and appeared as The Prince of Homburg at the Deutsche Theater under the direction of Max Reinhardt. One of Fröhlich's first film roles was composer Franz Liszt in Paganini in 1922. This was followed by a string of bit parts and supporting roles in film. He landed his breakthrough role as Freder Fredersen in Fritz Lang's film epic Metropolis (1927). Although the film itself was a financial failure, it established him as a leading film star in Germany. He was also notable for his appearance in Asphalt (1929), in which his restrained performance is still impressive today. In 1930, he was called to Hollywood to play roles in German versions of American films such as Die heilige Flamme and Kismet. He often appeared in musicals or comedies as a romantic hero and smart gentleman.

Third Reich 
In 1933, Fröhlich directed the film Rakoczy-Marsch, in which he also portrayed the leading role. He would direct another seven films  and was screenwriter on five, until the 1950s.

During the Third Reich, Gustav Fröhlich remained one of the foremost male stars in German film (along with Hans Albers, Willy Fritsch and Heinz Rühmann). Between 1931 and 1935, Fröhlich was married to Hungarian opera star, and actress Gitta Alpár, with whom he had a child, Julika.  He was engaged to the actress Lida Baarova until she became involved with the Nazi propaganda minister, Joseph Goebbels. There is also an unconfirmed story that Fröhlich slapped Goebbels in a fit of jealous rage. In 1937, he rented his house in Berchtesgaden to Hitler's architect, Albert Speer. In 1941, he served in the Wehrmacht Landschützen-Regiment and in the same year, married Maria Hajek. They remained married until her death in 1987.

Later life 
Gustav Fröhlich was seldom involved in Nazi Propaganda films, a fact that helped him to establish a new film career after World War II. He remained a busy actor after the war but his roles changed from leading men to supporting parts as he got older. His best-known role during this time was perhaps in Die Sünderin (1951) with Hildegard Knef, in which Fröhlich portrayed a terminally ill painter. Die Sünderin caused a scandal because of its open treatment of several taboos such as nudity, suicide and euthanasia.

Fröhlich generally retired from  film business in 1956, but he still managed to make occasional film and television appearances until the early 1980s. In 1973, he received the German Film Award for Lifetime Achievements. From 1956, Fröhlich lived in Lugano, Switzerland, where he died in 1987, from complications after surgery.

Selected filmography

References

External links 

Photographs of Gustav Fröhlich

1902 births
1987 deaths
20th-century German male actors
German male film actors
German male silent film actors
German male stage actors
Actors from Hanover
People from Lugano